Eliahu Inbal (born 16 February 1936, Jerusalem) is an Israeli conductor.

Inbal studied violin at the Israeli Academy of Music and took composition lessons with Paul Ben-Haim. Upon hearing him there, Leonard Bernstein endorsed a scholarship for Inbal to study conducting at the Conservatoire de Paris, and he also took courses with Sergiu Celibidache and Franco Ferrara in Hilversum, Netherlands. At Novara, he won first prize at the 1963 Guido Cantelli conducting competition at the age of 26. Since after that, Eliahu Inbal has enjoyed a career of international renown, conducting leading orchestras around the world. 

Inbal made most of his early appearances in Italy, but a successful British debut in 1965 with the London Philharmonic led to a number of other engagements with British orchestras. He subsequently worked with a number of orchestras throughout Europe and in America, and eventually took joint British citizenship.

From 1974 to 1990, he was the principal conductor of the Frankfurt Radio Symphony Orchestra in Frankfurt. With them, he was the first to record the original versions of several of Anton Bruckner's symphonies, for which he won the Jahrespreis der deutschen Schallplatten-Kritik. He also has recorded two complete cycles each of the symphonies of Gustav Mahler and Dmitri Shostakovich. From 1984 to 1989, he was chief conductor at La Fenice in Venice. From 2003 to 2011, he conducted a series of the complete symphonies of Bruckner at the Rheingau Musik Festival with the WDR Symphony Orchestra Cologne, concluding with the unfinished Ninth Symphony. He was appointed music director of La Fenice in January, 2007.

From 2009 to 2012, Inbal served as the chief conductor of the Czech Philharmonic. Inbal also served as the principal conductor of the Tokyo Metropolitan Symphony Orchestra from 2008 to 2014, and currently is the Conductor Laureate of the orchestra.

In August 2019, Inban began his tenure as the chief conductor of the Taipei Symphony Orchestra with a contract of three years. His contract was extended in April 2022, although he decided in June to leave the orchestra when his original term expired.

Inbal has conducted a wide variety of works. He is best known for his interpretations of late-Romantic works, but is also noted as an opera conductor, and has given the premieres of a number of modern works.

References

1936 births
Living people
Jewish classical musicians
Composers from Jerusalem
Conservatoire de Paris alumni
Israeli Jews
British Jews
Jews in Mandatory Palestine
Naturalised citizens of the United Kingdom
21st-century conductors (music)
Israeli emigrants to the United Kingdom
Israeli expatriates in the Czech Republic
Israeli expatriates in Italy
Israeli expatriates in Germany
20th-century Israeli composers
Israeli expatriates in Japan
Israeli expatriates in Taiwan